A nighthawk is a nocturnal bird.

Nighthawk(s) or Night Hawk(s) may also refer to:
 Nighthawks (painting), by Edward Hopper, 1942

Books and comics
 Nighthawk (novel), a 2017 novel by Clive Cussler
 Night Hawk (comics), a British superhero fictional character
 Night Hawk, fictional character appearing in Harvey Comics
 Nighthawk (DC Comics), a fictional cowboy
 Nighthawk (Marvel Comics), several characters

Film and TV
 The Night Hawk (1921 film), British silent drama film
 The Night Hawk (1924 film), American Western film
 The Night Hawk (1938 film), American crime film
 Nighthawks (1978 film), British gay-themed film by Ron Peck
 Nighthawks (1981 film), American crime thriller
 Nighthawks (2019 film), American drama thriller by Grant S. Johnson
 Nighthawks (TV series), Irish comedy

Music
 Coon-Sanders Original Nighthawk Orchestra, jazz band founded by Carleton Coon and Joe Sanders
 Gibson Nighthawk, an electric guitar
 Night Hawk (album), a 1961 album by Coleman Hawkins
 Nighthawk Records, a music label
 Nighthawks Orchestra, jazz group led by Vince Giordano
 Nighthawks, American rap duo formed by Camu Tao and Cage
 Nighthawks (Nighthawks album), a 2002 album by the duo
 Nighthawks (Erik Friedlander album), 2014
 Robert Nighthawk, Blues musician (1909–1967)
 The Nighthawks, an American blues and roots music band
 "Nighthawks", a song by Two Hours Traffic from the album Little Jabs
 Vince Giordano and his Nighthawks, American jazz and swing band
 Nighthawks at the Diner, the third studio album by Tom Waits

Sports 
 Night Hawk (lacrosse), Canadian lacrosse player at the 1904 Summer Olympics
 New Haven Nighthawks, a former ice hockey team
 North Georgia Nighthawks, the athletic program of the University of North Georgia
 Omaha Nighthawks, a former American football team
 Rochester Knighthawks, a National Lacrosse League team
 Thomas University Nighthawks, the athletic teams of Thomas University in Thomasville, Georgia
 Vancouver Nighthawks (WBL), a former World Basketball team
 Night Hawk, a bobsled driven by Steven Holcomb
 Night Hawk (horse), a Thoroughbred horse
 Guelph Nighthawks, a basketball team in the Canadian Elite Basketball League
 Stuart Broad, England cricketer

Aircraft
 Lockheed F-117 Nighthawk, stealth military aircraft
 Nighthawk, a sailplane variant of the Bowlus SP-1 Paperwing glider
 The Nighthawks, nickname of the HMX-1 U.S. Marine Corps helicopter Squadron
 Supermarine Nighthawk, a quadraplane fighter
 409 Tactical Fighter Squadron of the Canadian Air Force originally set up as the British RAF's No. 409 Nighthawk Squadron

Other
 Honda Nighthawk, a motorcycle line
 Nighthawk Custom, a firearm company based in Berryville, Arkansas
 Nighthawk (roller coaster), at Carowinds amusement park
 Nighthawk, Washington, an unincorporated community in the U.S. state
 Nighthawk, the common name of Apocordulia macrops, a species of Australian dragonfly
 Nighthawk, A series of Networking Products Manufactured By Netgear

See also
 Nighthawking, illegal metal-detecting